Anthony Lapsley (born February 13, 1980) is an American professional mixed martial artist, who most recently competed in the Welterweight division of the Ultimate Fighting Championship. A professional competitor since 2006, Lapsley has also formerly competed for King of the Cage, Bellator, ShoXC, HDNet Fights, and is the former King of the Cage Welterweight Champion.

Background
Lapsley was born in Boston, Massachusetts where he lived until he was 11 years old when he moved to Fort Wayne, Indiana. Athletic, Lapsley played various sports including basketball and after his freshman season playing high school football ended, his coach encouraged him to try wrestling. Lapsley began the sport and excelled, earning a state championship but did not continue his career as he did not have the academic requirements to get a scholarship.

Mixed martial arts career
Lapsley made his professional mixed martial arts debut in 2006. He quickly amassed an undefeated record of 7-0 before his first loss to Carlo Prater.

Lapsley has fought for a variety of promotions including ShoXC, HDNet Fights and King of the Cage, where he was the Welterweight Champion.

Bellator Fighting Championships
Lapsley made his Bellator debut in 2009 at Bellator 7 where he defeated Ryan Williams via submission.

In January 2011, Bellator announced that Lapsley will be replacing Steve Carl in the Bellator Season 4 Welterweight Tournament and he faced former UFC and Strikeforce veteran, Jay Hieron in the quarterfinals.  Lapsley lost via controversial stoppage when referee Josh Rosenthal stopped the bout, believing incorrectly that Lapsley was unconscious from a submission.

Ultimate Fighting Championship
In October 2013, it was announced that Lapsley had signed with the UFC.  He made his debut against Jason High on November 16, 2013 at UFC 167. He lost the fight via unanimous decision.

In his second fight for the promotion, Lapsley faced Albert Tumenov at UFC Fight Night 40 on May 10, 2014. He lost the fight via knockout in the first round, and was subsequently released from the promotion.

Return from Retirement 
After 8 years away from the cage, Lapsley made his return on October 15, 2022 against Collin Huckbody at Art of Scrap 5, losing the bout via rear-naked choke in the first round.

Personal life
Lapsley has eight children.

At the time of his UFC signing, Lapsley had just received his third conviction for domestic violence.

Championships and accomplishments

Mixed martial arts
King of the Cage
KOTC Welterweight Championship (One time)

Mixed martial arts record

|-
|Loss
|align=center| 23–8 (2)
|Collin Huckbody
|Submission (rear-naked choke)
|Art of Scrap 5
|
|align=center|1 
|align=center|3:14
|Fort Wayne, Indiana, United States
|
|-
| Loss
| align=center| 23–7 (2)
| Albert Tumenov
| KO (punch)
| UFC Fight Night: Brown vs. Silva
| 
| align=center| 1
| align=center| 3:56
| Cincinnati, Ohio, United States
|Lapsley missed weight.
|-
| Loss
| align=center| 23–6 (2)
| Jason High
| Decision (unanimous)
| UFC 167
| 
| align=center| 3
| align=center| 5:00
| Las Vegas, Nevada, United States
| 
|-
| Win
| align=center| 23–5 (2)
| John Troyer 
| Decision (unanimous)
| MMA Xtreme: Fists Will Fly
| 
| align=center| 3
| align=center| 5:00
| Evansville, Indiana, United States
| 
|-
| Win
| align=center| 22–5 (2)
| Gerald Meerschaert	
| Submission (rear-naked choke)
| Rocktagon MMA: Elite Series 23
| 
| align=center| 1
| align=center| 1:51
| Cleveland, Ohio, United States
|Catchweight (175 lbs) bout.
|-
| Win
| align=center| 21–5 (2)
| Tony Parker
| Submission (rear-naked choke)
| International Combat Entertainment 55
| 
| align=center| 1
| align=center| 2:43
| Dayton, Ohio, United States
|Middleweight bout.
|-
| Win
| align=center| 20–5 (2)
| Daniel Head
| Decision (unanimous)
| Colosseum Combat 18 
| 
| align=center| 3
| align=center| 5:00
| Kokomo, Indiana, United States
| 
|-
| Win
| align=center| 19–5 (2)
| Jon Kennedy
| Submission (heel hook)
| Extreme Challenge 191  
| 
| align=center| 1
| align=center| 1:32
| Bettendorf, Iowa, United States
| 
|-
| Loss
| align=center| 18–5 (2)
| Jay Hieron
| Technical Submission (rear-naked choke)
| Bellator 35
| 
| align=center| 1
| align=center| 3:39
| Lemoore, California, United States
| 
|-
| Win
| align=center| 18–4 (2)
| Ted Worthington
| Submission (rear-naked choke)
| IFC: Extreme Challenge
| 
| align=center| 2
| align=center| 2:08
| Mount Pleasant, Michigan, United States
| 
|-
| Win
| align=center| 17–4 (2)
| Frederic Belleton
| Submission (kneebar)
| Moosin: God of Martial Arts
| 
| align=center| 1
| align=center| 0:59
| Worcester, Massachusetts, United States
|Middleweight bout.
|-
| Win
| align=center| 16–4 (2)
| Dave Mewborn
| Decision (unanimous)
| Fury Fight Promotions: The Storm 
| 
| align=center| 3
| align=center| 5:00
| North Charleston, South Carolina, United States
| 
|-
| Win
| align=center| 15–4 (2)
| Ryan Williams
| Submission (rear-naked choke)
| Bellator 7
| 
| align=center| 2
| align=center| 4:22
| Chicago, Illinois, United States
| 
|-
| Loss
| align=center| 14–4 (2)
| Mike Guymon
| Submission (arm-triangle choke)
| KOTC: Prowler
| 
| align=center| 5
| align=center| 3:37
| Highland, California, United States
| 
|-
| Win
| align=center| 14–3 (2)
| Mike Stumpf
| Decision (majority)
| ShoXC: Elite Challenger Series
| 
| align=center| 3
| align=center| 5:00
| Hammond, Indiana, United States
| 
|-
| Win
| align=center| 13–3 (2)
| Aaron Wetherspoon
| Submission (scarf hold armlock)
| KOTC: Bio Hazard
| 
| align=center| 1
| align=center| 1:34
| Highland, California, United States
| 
|-
| NC
| align=center| 12–3 (2)
| Aaron Wetherspoon
| NC (double KO) 
| KOTC: Opposing Force
| 
| align=center| 2
| align=center| 0:18
| Highland, California, United States
| 
|-
| Win
| align=center| 12–3 (1)
| Tyler Stinson
| Submission (triangle choke)  	
| Midwest Cage Combat 
| 
| align=center| 2
| align=center| 3:39
| Wichita, Kansas, United States
| 
|-
| NC
| align=center| 11–3 (1)
| Jaime Jara
| No Contest 
| KOTC: Arch Rivals
| 
| align=center| 2
| align=center| 1:17
| Reno, Nevada, United States
| 
|-
| Loss
| align=center| 11–3
| Drew Fickett
| Submission (rear-naked choke)
| HDNet Fights 1
| 
| align=center| 1
| align=center| 3:55
| Dallas, Texas, United States
| 
|-
| Win
| align=center| 11–2
| Brent Weedman
| TKO (doctor stoppage)
| United Fight League 
| 
| align=center| 1
| align=center| 3:24
| Indianapolis, Indiana, United States
| 
|-
| Loss
| align=center| 10–2
| John Mahlow
| Technical Submission (armbar)
| Ultimate Warrior Challenge 
| 
| align=center| 3
| align=center| 3:38
| Jacksonville, Florida, United States
| 
|-
| Win
| align=center| 10–1
| David Gardner
| Decision (unanimous)
| World Cage Fighting 1
| 
| align=center| 3
| align=center| 5:00
| Southaven, Mississippi, United States
| 
|-
| Win
| align=center| 9–1
| Kyle Gibbons
| Submission (triangle choke)
| LOF 18: Pole Position 
| 
| align=center| 1
| align=center| 2:45
| Indianapolis, Indiana, United States
| 
|-
| Win
| align=center| 8–1
| Andre Luis Novoes Pimenta
| Submission (triangle choke)
| IMMAC 2: Attack
| 
| align=center| 1
| align=center| 2:15
| Chicago, Illinois, United States
| 
|-
| Win
| align=center| 7–1
| Josh Hickenbottom
| Submission (armbar)
| FCFS 9: Battlefield 
| 
| align=center| 1
| align=center| 0:48
| Merrillville, Indiana, United States
| 
|-
| Loss
| align=center| 6–1
| Carlo Prater
| Decision (unanimous)
| Art of War 1 
| 
| align=center| 3
| align=center| 5:00
| Dallas, Texas, United States
| 
|-
| Win
| align=center| 6–0
| John Mahlow
| Submission (triangle choke)
| KOTC: Mass Destruction
| 
| align=center| 1
| align=center| N/A
| Mount Pleasant, Michigan, United States
| 
|-
| Win
| align=center| 5–0
| Travis Burnett
| Submission (armbar)
| FCFS 6: Redemption
| 
| align=center| 1
| align=center| 1:28
| Fort Wayne, Indiana, United States
| 
|-
| Win
| align=center| 4–0
| Doug Sparks
| TKO (punches)
| Extreme Combat Challenge: Season's Beatings 
| 
| align=center| 2
| align=center| 1:59
| Muncie, Indiana, United States
| 
|-
| Win
| align=center| 3–0
| Rok Wyler
| Submission (rear-naked choke)
| FCFS 4: Damage Control 
| 
| align=center| 1
| align=center| 0:49
| Auburn, Indiana, United States
| 
|-
| Win
| align=center| 2–0
| Curt Bee
| TKO (punches)
| KOTC: Meltdown
| 
| align=center| 2
| align=center| 1:34
| Indianapolis, Indiana, United States
| 
|-
| Win
| align=center| 1–0
| Dave Morris
| Submission (choke) 
| Kombat Zone 5 
| 
| align=center| 1
| align=center| 4:32
| Fort Wayne, Indiana, United States
|

See also
List of male mixed martial artists
List of King of the Cage champions

References

External links
 
 

1980 births
Living people
African-American mixed martial artists
American male mixed martial artists
Sportspeople from Boston
Sportspeople from Fort Wayne, Indiana
Welterweight mixed martial artists
Mixed martial artists utilizing collegiate wrestling
Ultimate Fighting Championship male fighters
21st-century African-American sportspeople
20th-century African-American people